Saint Elpidius the Cappadocian (4th century) was an abbot and saint of Asia Minor.  Tradition states that he lived in a cave in Cappadocia for twenty-five years.  Disciples, such as Eustace (Eustachio) and Ennesius (Ennesio), gathered around him.

Veneration
The village of Cluana, in the Marches of Ancona, acquired Elpidius' relics in the 7th century in exchange for the donation of a piece of land.  The relics of Elpidius and his companions Eustace and Ennesius were consigned to the local inhabitants, and the town later acquired the new name of Sant'Elpidio a Mare.  The relics of Elpidius are considered to have saved the town from a Lombard siege; tradition states that the saint appeared in the sky asking the inhabitants to defend the village.

References

External links
Saint of the Day, September 2: Elpidius the Cappadocian at SaintPatrickDC.org
Sant'Elpidio a Mare
Vitae patrum

Cappadocia (Roman province)
Saints from Roman Anatolia
Italian Roman Catholic saints
4th-century Christian saints
People from Cappadocia
Sant'Elpidio a Mare